Madara Līduma (born 10 August 1982 in Gulbene, Latvia) is a former World Cup level Latvian biathlete.

Her career best achievement is the 10th place at the 2006 Torino Olympics 15 kilometre individual race.
In autumn 2011 she took decision to quit her professional career due to lack of finance.

World Cup totals

External links
IBU profile – At biathlonworld.com

Latvian female biathletes
1982 births
Living people
Olympic biathletes of Latvia
Biathletes at the 2006 Winter Olympics
Biathletes at the 2010 Winter Olympics
People from Gulbene